Donald Glen Wilson (born September 10, 1954), nicknamed "The Dragon", is an American martial artist, film actor, and former professional kickboxer. An 11-time world champion who scored 47 knockouts in four decades, he has been called by the STAR System Ratings as "perhaps the greatest kickboxer in American history. He has disposed of more quality competition than anyone we've ever ranked".

Biography

Early life
Wilson was born to a Japanese mother and American father in Alton, Illinois. He utilized his mother's family name, Hoshino (星野), as a ring name while competing in Japan.

He attended Saint Andrew's School in Boca Raton, where he was an MVP in football and basketball. Wilson also tried his hand at wrestling, in which he excelled enough to score a 4th place in the Florida State Collegiate Wrestling competition.

After high school, Wilson was accepted into the prestigious Coast Guard Academy in New London, Connecticut in the fall of 1972. Wilson has stated that his brother challenged him to friendly sparring, which he imagined he would dominate since Wilson was more physically imposing and athletic than his brother. To his surprise, he was easily knocked around by his brother's martial arts ability. He credits this experience for making a believer out of him, after which he would pursue martial arts. He began studying Goju-ryu Karate with Sensei Chuck Merriman for two hours a week for one year.

In 1973, Wilson left the academy and earned an associate degree in electrical engineering at Brevard Community College in Florida. He then enrolled at his father's alma mater, the Florida Institute of Technology, but dropped out to pursue a professional fighting career, to the elder Wilson's disappointment. During this time, he was trained by his brother Jim in Pai Lum Kung-Fu, a form derivative of Shaolin Kung Fu.

Don's nickname, "The Dragon" was used in his first professional kickboxing match in Orlando. He also had two other nicknames that were used at times during his long career.

In July 1977, Wilson defeated Howard Hayden. A report of the match in Official Karate Magazine said, "Don Wilson's showboat tactics have seen him through a couple of fights, but the Flash won't last long when the going gets tough." Wilson said he was hugely insulted; a few people began to refer to him as Don "The Flash" Wilson, which annoyed him. He said this inspired him to prove something: "I got serious."

Kickboxing career
Wilson won a total of 11 World Titles with several sanctioning bodies that included the IKF, WKA, KICK, ISKA, STAR and the PKO. He won his IKF (www.IKFKickboxing.com) FCR Cruiserweight World Title on May 15, 1999, in Lowell, Massachusetts, USA, when he defeated Dick Kimber. (Lynn, Massachusetts, USA PRO: 23-3/21, AM: 25-0/25 5'9" 197 lbs) At the end of the 3rd round Wilson came alive and exploded with a flurry that eventually knocked Kimber to the floor motionless. Referee Dan Stell counted Kimber out on the floor, a count that went into the round break. Kimber never stood during the count.

Having never been challenged for his title, Wilson voluntarily retired it to move down to the Light Heavyweight Division, where he eventually retired from fighting a few years later.

According to Inside Kung-Fu Presents Kickboxing Magazine (August 1992), Don Wilson's professional kickboxing record was listed as 69 wins, 5 losses, 2 draws, 46 knockout wins, and 6 kick-knockouts, and 3 no-contests. On page 64, Wilson's first match with Bill Knoblok in Orlando, Florida in December 1974 is listed as a 3-round no-contest. However, on page 52 in the same issue, Wilson said about his fight with Knoblok, " But Bill won the third round by a larger margin than I had won the first. So he won the bout." Today the official result of this fight was listed as a no-contest on Wilson's official fight record because when he decided to fight for PKA, Joe Corley felt the rule of the bout was quite different from those of PKA, Corley told Wilson to omit it.

Wilson's kickboxing career spanned 4 decades; his first fight with Bill Knoblok in 1974 and his last fight, a 10th-round knockout victory over Eddie Butcher on July 19, 2002, in Atlantic City, New Jersey. He defeated among others, world champions Branko Cikatic, James Warring, Dennis Alexio, and Maurice Smith. Wilson fought a draw with another champion, Jean-Yves Thériault. In 79 bouts, Wilson was only knocked out by Glen McMorris in 1980. Wilson's kickboxing record is listed as 72–5–2 (48 knockouts) with 3 no-contests.

Wilson was noted for being an American-style kickboxer who challenged the fabled fighters from Thailand. He prevailed in most instances, only suffering a loss.  However, the matches were always problematic, due to the differences in traditions, style and judging. For his fight against Samart, the officials who arranged the fight broke the previous arrangement, placing Wilson against a lighter opponent and forcing Wilson to lose 8 pounds on the day of the bout by sitting in a sauna from early morning until two hours before the bout, leaving him dangerously dehydrated. Wilson had also negotiated for a 7-round fight, which the officials also neglected. Furthermore, the thai judges only recognized Muay Thai techniques such as thai kick or those performed within the clinch, which meant that Wilson's only hope to win was to knockout Samart, which he was unable to do because of his dehydration. Wilson, a fighter used to 12 round fights, was exhausted in the 2nd round, a clear indication of the seriousness of his condition. Such reckless endangerment of a fighter's life would have been met with judicial repercussions had it occurred under a western sanctioning body. Despite this unsporting and outrageous treatment , Wilson didn't push to have the result of the fight overturned and accepted his loss.

Wilson was scheduled to make a comeback at 58 years old, against an unnamed opponent in a ten-rounder in Istanbul, Turkey in 2013. However at the last minute the fight in Istanbul was cancelled due to "breach of contract and non-performance of financial agreements".
In 2014, he was honored with the U.F. of Legends Dragon Award at the Urban Action Showcase & Expo at HBO.

Kickboxing losses turned into no contests
Early in Wilson's career, he lost three fights by decision; these losses were changed into no contests by the PKA (Professional Karate Association).

Wilson's first career match was against Bill Knoblock and he lost a 3rd decision. This match was later turned into a no contest by the Professional Karate Association as they listed it as an "amateur" match. "This amateur bout was part of Wilson's black belt examination." However, in a 2013 interview,  Wilson recalled his first fight as a loss to Bill Knoblock on January 25, 1975, as a professional match in which he was paid $100 U.S. dollars.

On May 28, 1976, in Tampa, Florida, Wilson lost a 5-round decision to Rudy Burney in a PKA sanctioned match. However, the PKA later overturned the decision for, "improper procedures that impeded fair competition."

Finally, in September 1976, Wilson lost a 5-round points decision to Herb Thompson in Fort Lauderdale, Florida. The PKA overturned the decision, citing improper procedures and inappropriate equipment which impeded fair competition.

Fighting style 
Wilson was fairly notable thanks to his unique fighting style as used in the ring. He was ambidextrous, being able to switch stance on a whim and attack powerfully with either side, although he preferred to fight strong-side forward, which is a characteristic of some Chinese Martial arts like Pai Lum Tao Ng Ying Kungfu (Chinese: 五形功夫) he was known for being very good at Indian leg wrestling also. He identified himself as mainly a kicker, claiming that was his forte and the reason why he never seriously considered boxing.

He has a particularly devastating lead side kick, and was known to perform single-leg multiple kicks in rapid succession. Despite his focus on kicks, most of his K.O's came through his punching, and he was particularly good with his lead (right) hook punch.

Commentating career 
Wilson was a fight commentator and interviewer in many of the early UFC events, beginning with UFC 7 in Buffalo. He stated several times that he would be willing to fight in the UFC himself if enough fans requested it, but it never happened. He went on to be a commentator for King of the Cage.

Film appearances
Some movies to his credit include: Futurekick, Bloodfist 1–8, Ring of Fire 1, 2 & 3, Out for Blood, Operation Cobra, Blackbelt, Cyber Tracker 1 & 2, Terminal Rush, Redemption, Say Anything... Capitol Conspiracy, Moving Target, and Batman Forever as the leader of the Neon Gang.

Kickboxing titles
2010 World Kickboxing Hall of Fame Champion
2008 European Martial Arts Hall of Fame Member
2000 I.S.K.A. Full Contact Cruiserweight North American Champion −190 lbs
1999 I.K.F. Full Contact Cruiserweight World Champion −190 lbs
1989 P.K.O. Full Contact Light Heavyweight World Champion −170 lbs
1988–89 I.S.K.A. Full Contact Cruiserweight World Champion −182 lbs (0 title defences – vacated)
1984 S.T.A.R. Undisputed Full Contact Light Heavyweight World Champion −175 lbs
1984 W.K.A. Full Contact Super Light Heavyweight World Champion −184 lbs
1984 S.T.A.R. Undisputed Full Contact Super Light Heavyweight World Champion −184 lbs
1983–84 W.K.A. Full Contact Cruiserweight World Champion −190 lbs (0 title defences – vacated)
1983 S.T.A.R. Undisputed Full Contact Cruiserweight World Champion −184 lbs
1983–87 K.I.C.K. Full Contact Light Heavyweight World Champion −175 lbs (2 title defences)
1980–91 W.K.A. Full Contact Light Heavyweight World Champion −175 lbs (9 title defences – vacated)
1980 S.T.A.R. Undisputed Full Contact Light Heavyweight World Champion −175 lbs
1979–80 P.K.A. Full Contact Middleweight United States Champion −170 lbs (2 title defences)
1978–79 P.K.A. Full Contact Middleweight Florida State Champion −170 lbs (4 title defences – vacated)

Professional kickboxing record

|-  style="text-align:center; background:#f7f6a8;"
| 2011-12-03 || Exhibition ||align=left| Kash Gill || "Cinema against Pain" @ Almaty, ||Kazakhstan || Exhibition || 3 || || 72–5–2–3
|-  style="text-align:center; background:#cfc;"
| 2002-07-19 || Win ||align=left| Eddie Butcher || "A Night Of Champions", I.S.K.A. Event @ Tropicana Hotel || Atlantic City, New Jersey, USA || KO (Overhand Right) || 10 || || 72–5–2–3
|-  style="text-align:center; background:#cfc;"
| 2000-03-17 || Win ||align=left| Dewey Cooper || I.S.K.A. Event @ MGM Grand || Las Vegas, Nevada, USA || Decision || 10 || 2:00 || 71–5–2–3
|-
! style=background:white colspan=9 |
|-  style="text-align:center; background:#cfc;"
| 1999-05-14 || Win ||align=left| Dick Kimber || I.K.F. Event @ Tsongas Arena || Lowell, Massachusetts, USA || TKO || 3 || 2:08 || 70–5–2–3
|-
! style=background:white colspan=9 |
|-  style="text-align:center; background:#cfc;"
| 1991-01-12 || Win ||align=left| Ghalib Carmichael || W.K.A. Event || Anaheim, California, USA || Decision || 11 || 2:00 || 69–5–2–3
|-
! style=background:white colspan=9 |
|-  style="text-align:center; background:#f7f6a8;"
| 1991-12-03 ||Exhibition ||align=left| Gary Daniels ||World Martial Arts Extravaganza || Birmingham, England ||Exhibition|| 3 || || 68–5–2–3
|-  style="text-align:center; background:#cfc;"
| 1990-07-27 || Win ||align=left| Yuleeb Kazakov || K.I.C.K. & I.S.K.A. Event @ West Palm Beach Auditorium || West Palm Beach, Florida, USA || TKO || 5 || || 68–5–2–3
|-  style="text-align:center; background:#cfc;"
| 1989-12-01 || Win ||align=left| Maurizio Curallo || P.K.O. Event || Rome, Italy || TKO (Gave Up) || 1 || || 67–5–2–3
|-  style="text-align:center; background:#cfc;"
| 1989-11-27 || Win ||align=left| Giuliano Grillo || P.K.O. Event || Milan, Italy || TKO || 2 || || 66–5–2–3
|-  style="text-align:center; background:#fbb;"
| 1989-11-04 || Loss ||align=left| Marek Piotrowski || F.F.K.A. & P.K.C. Event @ Odeum Expo Center || Chicago, Illinois, USA || Decision (Split) || 12 || 2:00 || 65–5–2–3
|-
! style=background:white colspan=9 |
|-  style="text-align:center; background:#cfc;"
| 1989-07-03 || Win ||align=left| Mike Winkeljohn || W.K.A. Event || Costa Mesa, California, USA || TKO || 10 || || 65–4–2–3
|-  style="text-align:center; background:#cfc;"
| 1989-04-20 || Win ||align=left| Keith Wilson || P.K.O. Event || London, England, UK || TKO || 4 || || 64–4–2–3
|-  style="text-align:center; background:#cfc;"
| 1989-04-13 || Win ||align=left| Ken Stranberg || P.K.O. Event || Gothenburg, Sweden || Decision || 5 || 2:00 || 63–4–2–3
|-  style="text-align:center; background:#cfc;"
| 1989-03-18 || Win ||align=left| Ferdinand Mack || P.K.O. Event || Berlin, Germany || TKO || 9 || || 62–4–2–3
|-
! style=background:white colspan=9 |
|-  style="text-align:center; background:#cfc;"
| 1988-10-08 || Win ||align=left| Rob Salazar || I.S.K.A. Event || Lake Tahoe, Nevada, USA || Decision (Split) || 12 ||  || 61–4–2–3
|-
! style=background:white colspan=9 |
|-  style="text-align:center; background:#cfc;"
| 1988-07-30 || Win ||align=left| Carl Englund || W.K.A. & K.I.C.K. Event @ James L. Knight Center || Miami, Florida, USA || TKO || 4 || || 60–4–2–3
|-  style="text-align:center; background:#cfc;"
| 1987-12-12 || Win ||align=left| Branko Cikatić || K.I.C.K. Event || Orlando, Florida, USA || TKO (punches) || 7 || || 59–4–2–3
|-
! style=background:white colspan=9 |
|-  style="text-align:center; background:#cfc;"
| 1987-06-22 || Win ||align=left| Art Jimmerson || W.K.A. Event @ Brassy's Nightclub || Cocoa Beach, Florida, USA || KO || 6 || || 58–4–2–3
|-  style="text-align:center; background:#cfc;"
| 1987-04-22 || Win ||align=left| Roger Hurd || W.K.A. Event @ Brassy's Nightclub || Cocoa Beach, Florida, USA || TKO || 4 || || 57–4–2–3
|-
! style=background:white colspan=9 |
|-  style="text-align:center; background:#cfc;"
| 1987-01-19 || Win ||align=left| Paul Ford || W.K.A. Event || Merrit Island, Florida, USA || TKO || 6 || || 56–4–2–3
|-  style="text-align:center; background:#cfc;"
| 1986-09-22 || Win ||align=left| Rich Lopez || W.K.A. Event @ Brassy's Nightclub || Cocoa Beach, Florida, USA || KO (Round Kick to Jaw) || 5 || || 55–4–2–3
|-
! style=background:white colspan=9 |
|-  style="text-align:center; background:#cfc;"
| 1985-12-06 || Win ||align=left| Charlie Archie || W.K.A. Event || Miami, Florida, USA || KO (Kick) || 1 || || 54–4–2–3
|-  style="text-align:center; background:#cfc;"
| 1985-11-10 || Win ||align=left| Michael Husbands || I.N.D. Event @ Verdun Auditorium || Montreal, Canada || TKO || 5 || || 53–4–2–3
|-  style="text-align:center; background:#c5d2ea;"
| 1984-12-18 || Draw ||align=left| Jean-Yves Thériault || I.N.D. Event @ Verdun Auditorium || Montreal, Canada || Decision Draw || 12 || 2:00 || 52–4–2–3
|-
! style=background:white colspan=9 |
|-  style="text-align:center; background:#cfc;"
| 1984-09-05 || Win ||align=left| Fanta Petchmuangtrat (Attapong Buadan)|| W.K.A. Event @ Queen Elizabeth Stadium || Hong Kong || Decision || 7 || 3:00 || 52–4–1–3
|-  style="text-align:center; background:#cfc;"
| 1984-03-29 || Win ||align=left| Dennis Alexio || W.K.A. Event || Hollywood, Florida, USA || Decision (Unanimous) || 12 || 2:00 || 51–4–1–3
|-
! style=background:white colspan=9 |
|-  style="text-align:center; background:#fbb;"
| 1983-12-02 || Loss ||align=left| Samart Prasarnmit || Royal Thai Army Welfare Event @ Lumpinee Stadium || Bangkok, Thailand || Decision || 5 || 3:00 || 50–4–1–3
|-  style="text-align:center; background:#f7f6a8;"
| 1983-11-03 || Exhibition ||align=left| A.W. Muhammad || W.K.C. Event @ West Palm Beach Auditorium || West Palm Beach, Florida, USA || Exhibition || 5 || 2:00 || 50–3–1–3
|-  style="text-align:center; background:#cfc;"
| 1983-09-26 || Win ||align=left| Pongdejnoi Prasopchai || W.K.A. Event @ Queen Elizabeth Stadium || Hong Kong || TKO (Spinning Back Kick) || 4 || || 50–3–1–3
|-  style="text-align:center; background:#cfc;"
| 1983-08-19 || Win ||align=left| Jarvis Gradner || W.K.A. Event || Cocoa Beach, Florida, USA || Decision || 9 || 2:00 || 49–3–1–3
|-  style="text-align:center; background:#cfc;"
| 1983-07-16 || Win ||align=left| Steve Valencia || K.I.C.K. Event || New York City, New York, USA || TKO || 4 || || 48–3–1–3
|-
! style=background:white colspan=9 |
|-  style="text-align:center; background:#cfc;"
| 1983-05-21 || Win ||align=left| Maurice Smith || W.K.A. Event || Tokyo, Japan || Decision || 11 || 2:00 || 47–3–1–3
|-
! style=background:white colspan=9 |
|-  style="text-align:center; background:#cfc;"
| 1983-04-19 || Win ||align=left| Curtis Crandall || K.I.C.K. Event @ Caesar's Palace || Las Vegas, Nevada, USA || TKO || 11 || || 46–3–1–3
|-
! style=background:white colspan=9 |
|-  style="text-align:center; background:#cfc;"
| 1983-03-19 || Win ||align=left| James Sisco || W.K.A. Event || Nassau, Bahamas || KO || 2 || || 45–3–1–3
|-  style="text-align:center; background:#cfc;"
| 1982-11-06 || Win ||align=left| Demetrius Edwards || W.K.C. Event @ West Palm Beach Auditorium || West Palm Beach, Florida, USA || Decision (Split) ||12 ||  || 44–3–1–3
|-  style="text-align:center; background:#cfc;"
| 1982-09-04 || Win ||align=left| James Warring || W.K.A. Event || Tokyo, Japan || Decision || 11 || 2:00 || 43–3–1–3
|-
! style=background:white colspan=9 |
|-  style="text-align:center; background:#cfc;"
| 1982-04-08 || Win ||align=left| Jaidee Pitsanurachan || W.K.A. Event @ Queen Elizabeth Stadium || Hong Kong || Decision || 9 || || 42–3–1–3
|-
! style=background:white colspan=9 |
|-  style="text-align:center; background:#cfc;"
| 1982-02-08 || Win ||align=left| James Sisco || W.K.A. Event @ Queen Elizabeth Stadium || Hong Kong || TKO || 4 || || 41–3–1–3
|-
! style=background:white colspan=9 |
|-  style="text-align:center; background:#cfc;"
| 1981-12-07 || Win ||align=left| Dennis Downey || W.K.A. Event @ Brassy's Nightclub || Cocoa Beach, Florida, USA || DQ (Biting) || 7 || || 40–3–1–3
|-  style="text-align:center; background:#cfc;"
| 1981-12-07 || Win ||align=left| Mark Zacharatos || W.K.A. Event @ Imperial Palace || Las Vegas, Nevada, USA || KO || 3 || || 39–3–1–3
|-
! style=background:white colspan=9 |
|-  style="text-align:center; background:#cfc;"
| 1981-09-08 || Win ||align=left| Jaidee Pitsanurachan|| W.K.A. Event @ Queen Elizabeth Stadium || Hong Kong || Decision (Split) || 7 || 2:00 || 38–3–1–3
|-
! style=background:white colspan=9 |
|-  style="text-align:center; background:#cfc;"
| 1981-07-25 || Win ||align=left| Al Mims || W.K.A. Event @ West Palm Beach Auditorium || West Palm Beach, Florida, USA || KO || 3 || || 37–3–1–3
|-  style="text-align:center; background:#cfc;"
| 1981-06-24 || Win ||align=left| Muhammed Ashraf Tai || W.K.A. Event || Tokyo, Japan || KO || 2 || || 36–3–1–3
|-  style="text-align:center; background:#cfc;"
| 1981-05-15 || Win ||align=left| Larry Nichols || W.K.A. Event @ St. Lucie Civic Center || Fort Pierce, Florida, USA || KO (Kick) || 5 || || 35–3–1–3
|-  style="text-align:center; background:#cfc;"
| 1981-03-23 || Win ||align=left| Greg Smith || W.K.A. Event @ Brassy's Nightclub || Cocoa Beach, Florida, USA || Decision || 5 || 2:00 || 34–3–1–3
|-  style="text-align:center; background:#cfc;"
| 1981-03-10 || Win ||align=left| Herbie Thompson || W.K.A. Event || Westchester, New York, USA || KO || 8 || || 33–3–1–3
|-
! style=background:white colspan=9 |
|-  style="text-align:center; background:#cfc;"
| 1981-02-10 || Win ||align=left| Eddie Dourant || W.K.A. Event @ St. Lucie Civic Center || Fort Pierce, Florida, USA || TKO || 7 || || 32–3–1–3
|-  style="text-align:center; background:#cfc;"
| 1980-12-01 || Win ||align=left| Larry Lockhart || W.K.A. Event @ Brassy's Nightclub || Cocoa Beach, Florida, USA || TKO || 4 || || 31–3–1–3
|-  style="text-align:center; background:#cfc;"
| 1980-10-13 || Win ||align=left| Andy White || W.K.A. Event @ Brassy's Nightclub || Cocoa Beach, Florida, USA || KO || 2 || || 30–3–1–3
|-
! style=background:white colspan=9 |
|-  style="text-align:center; background:#cfc;"
| 1980-07-21 || Win ||align=left| Rodney Batiste || P.K.A. World Championship Eliminations @ Brassy's Nightclub || Cocoa Beach, Florida, USA || Decision || 10 || 2:00 || 29–3–1–3
|-
! style=background:white colspan=9 |
|-  style="text-align:center; background:#cfc;"
| 1980-06-? || Win ||align=left| Steve Mackey || P.K.A. Event @ West Palm Beach Auditorium || West Palm Beach, Florida, USA || KO || 1 || || 28–3–1–3
|-  style="text-align:center; background:#cfc;"
| 1980-05-20 || Win ||align=left| Larry Doggert || P.K.A. Event @ Brassy's Nightclub | || Cocoa Beach, Florida, USA || KO || 7 || || 27–3–1–3
|-  style="text-align:center; background:#cfc;"
| 1980-04-14 || Win ||align=left| Bernard Clark || P.K.A. Event @ Brassy's Nightclub || Cocoa Beach, Florida, USA || TKO || 6 || || 26–3–1–3
|-  style="text-align:center; background:#fbb;"
| 1980-03-05 || Loss ||align=left| Glenn McMorris || P.K.A. Event @ West Palm Beach Auditorium || West Palm Beach, Florida, USA || TKO || 1 || || 25–3–1–3
|-
! style=background:white colspan=9 |
|-  style="text-align:center; background:#cfc;"
| 1980-02-08 || Win ||align=left| Larry Poore || West Palm Beach Auditorium || West Palm Beach, Florida, USA || TKO || 7 || || 25–2–1–3
|-  style="text-align:center; background:#cfc;"
| 1980-01-? || Win ||align=left| Greg Strong || P.K.A. Event || Miami, Florida, USA || TKO (Kick) || 7 || || 24–2–1–3
|-
! style=background:white colspan=9 |
|-  style="text-align:center; background:#c5d2ea;"
| 1979-11-10 || Draw ||align=left| Steve Mackey || P.K.A. Event || Orlando, Florida, USA || Technical Draw || 2 || || 23–2–1–3
|-  style="text-align:center; background:#cfc;"
| 1979-10-23 || Win ||align=left| Willie Ruffin || Orlando Sports Stadium || Orlando, Florida, USA || TKO || 5 || || 23–2–0–3
|-  style="text-align:center; background:#cfc;"
| 1979-09-15 || Win ||align=left| Jimmy Horsley || P.K.A. Event || Orlando, Florida, USA || TKO || 7 || || 22–2–0–3
|-
! style=background:white colspan=9 |
|-  style="text-align:center; background:#cfc;"
| 1979-08-? || Win ||align=left| Danny Wedges || W.K.A. Event @ West Palm Beach Auditorium || West Palm Beach, Florida, USA || KO || 1 || || 21–2–0–3
|-  style="text-align:center; background:#cfc;"
| 1979-08-? || Win ||align=left| John Shields || || Bradenton, Florida, USA || TKO || 2 || || 20–2–0–3
|-  style="text-align:center; background:#cfc;"
| 1979-07-? || Win ||align=left| Al Durr || || Orlando, Florida, USA || KO || 3 || || 19–2–0–3
|-  style="text-align:center; background:#cfc;"
| 1979-06-23 || Win ||align=left| Benny Fernandez || P.K.A. Event || Bradenton, Florida, USA || DQ (Hit & Hold Clinching) || 1 || || 18–2–0–3
|-
! style=background:white colspan=9 |
|-  style="text-align:center; background:#cfc;"
| 1979-06-09 || Win ||align=left| Willie Ruffin || || Miami, Florida, USA || TKO || 3 || || 17–2–0–3
|-  style="text-align:center; background:#cfc;"
| 1979-05-26 || Win ||align=left| Jeff Gripper || W.K.A. Event @ West Palm Beach Auditorium || West Palm Beach, Florida, USA || Decision || 7 || 2:00 || 16–2–0–3
|-  style="text-align:center; background:#cfc;"
| 1979-03-07 || Win ||align=left| Ted Pryor || West Palm Beach Auditorium || West Palm Beach, Florida, USA || Decision || 7 || 2:00 || 15–2–0–3
|-  style="text-align:center; background:#cfc;"
| 1979-02-17 || Win ||align=left| Rich Cook || P.K.A. Event || Stuart, Florida, USA || Decision || 7 || 2:00 || 14–2–0–3
|-
! style=background:white colspan=9 |
|-  style="text-align:center; background:#cfc;"
| 1979-01-13 || Win ||align=left| James Sisco || P.K.A. Event || Bradenton, Florida, USA || TKO || 4 || || 13–2–0–3
|-
! style=background:white colspan=9 |
|-  style="text-align:center; background:#cfc;"
| 1978-12-? || Win ||align=left| Rick Herranz || West Palm Beach Auditorium || West Palm Beach, Florida, USA || KO || 1 || || 12–2–0–3
|-  style="text-align:center; background:#cfc;"
| 1978-12-02 || Win ||align=left| Herbie Thompson || P.K.A. Event || Stuart, Florida, USA || Decision || 7 || 2:00 || 11–2–0–3
|-
! style=background:white colspan=9 |
|-  style="text-align:center; background:#cfc;"
| 1978-11-18 || Win ||align=left| Ron Harry || P.K.A. Event || Fort Lauderdale, Florida, USA || KO || 1 || || 10–2–0–3
|-  style="text-align:center; background:#fbb;"
| 1978-10-20 || Loss ||align=left| Robert Biggs || P.K.A. Event || West Palm Beach, Florida, USA || Decision (Split) || 5 || 2:00 || 9–2–0–3
|-  style="text-align:center; background:#cfc;"
| 1978-09-23 || Win ||align=left| Ted Pryor || P.K.A. Event || Fort Lauderdale, Florida, USA || Decision || 5 || 2:00 || 9–1–0–3
|-
! style=background:white colspan=9 |
|-  style="text-align:center; background:#cfc;"
| 1978-04-08 || Win ||align=left| Charlie Jordan || P.K.A. Event || Miami, Florida, USA || DQ (Failed Minimum Kicks Rule) || 4 || || 8–1–0–3
|-  style="text-align:center; background:#cfc;"
| 1977-10-08 || Win ||align=left| Robert Parris || || Melbourne, Florida, USA || Decision || 7 || 2:00 || 7–1–0–3
|-  style="text-align:center; background:#cfc;"
| 1977-09-10 || Win ||align=left| James Sisco || P.K.A. Event || Miami, Florida, USA || KO (Side Kick to Body) || 3 || || 6–1–0–3
|-  style="text-align:center; background:#cfc;"
| 1977-07-18 || Win ||align=left| Howard Hayden || West Palm Beach Auditorium || West Palm Beach, Florida, USA || Decision || 5 || 2:00 || 5–1–0–3
|-  style="text-align:center; background:#cfc;"
| 1977-05-? || Win ||align=left| John Sweet || || Miami, Florida, USA || Decision || 5 || 2:00 || 4–1–0–3
|-  style="text-align:center; background:#cfc;"
| 1977-03-? || Win ||align=left| Robert Dillard || || Melbourne, Florida, USA || Decision || 3 || 2:00 || 3–1–0–3
|-  style="text-align:center; background:#c5d2ea;"
| 1976-09-? || NC ||align=left| Herbie Thompson || || Fort Lauderdale, Florida, USA || No Contest || 5 || 2:00 || 2–1–0–3
|-
! style=background:white colspan=9 |
|-  style="text-align:center; background:#c5d2ea;"
| 1976-05-28 || NC ||align=left| Rudy Burney || P.K.A. Event || Tampa, Florida, USA || No Contest || 5 || 2:00 || 2–1–0–2
|-
! style=background:white colspan=9 |
|-  style="text-align:center; background:#fbb;"
| 1975-11-? || Loss ||align=left| Steve Shepherd || || Miami, Florida, USA || Decision || 3 || 2:00 || 2–1–0–1
|-  style="text-align:center; background:#cfc;"
| 1975-08-? || Win ||align=left| Ben Green || || Melbourne, Florida, USA || Decision || 5 || 2:00 || 2–0–0–1
|-  style="text-align:center; background:#cfc;"
| 1975-05-? || Win ||align=left| Ken Broadway || || Melbourne, Florida, USA || KO (Side Kick to Body) || 3 || || 1–0–0–1
|-  style="text-align:center; background:#c5d2ea;"
| 1975-01-25 || NC ||align=left| Bill Knoblock || Space Coast Karate Tournament || Orlando, Florida, USA || No Contest || 3 || 2:00 || 0-0-0-1
|-
! style=background:white colspan=9 |
|-
|-
| colspan=9 | Legend:

Professional boxing career

Wilson had a brief professional boxing career. Wilson said in a 2015 interview that he had a 6–3–0 professional boxing record with all three defeats by first round stoppage. He admits a change in his style lead to only an average boxing career.

His biggest victory was against Muhammad Ali's former sparring partner John L. Johnson. Wilson's last boxing match took place against Tim Jones on October 21, 1986, at the Reseda Country Club in California. Wilson had a 6–2–0 record in professional boxing going into this match, while Jones was winless in 6 bouts. Wilson lost by TKO at 2:58 of the first round. Dennis Alexio, who lost a kickboxing match to Wilson, had already defeated Jones. Jones lost his next 4 boxing matches, and retired with a 1–10–0 record.

Professional boxing record

Filmography

References

External links
Official website
Don "The Dragon" Wilson Interview on WorldKickboxing.Net

Don "The Dragon" Wilson Wilson's Site On IKF
Interview with Don "The Dragon Wilson"

1954 births
American male kickboxers
American male film actors
American film actors of Asian descent
American sportspeople of Japanese descent
American wushu practitioners
Cruiserweight kickboxers
Eastern Florida State College people
Florida Institute of Technology alumni
Kickboxers from Illinois
Kickboxers from Florida
Kickboxing commentators
Light heavyweight kickboxers
Living people
Male actors from Florida
American male actors of Japanese descent
Middleweight kickboxers
Mixed martial arts broadcasters
United States Coast Guard Academy alumni